Nuland may refer to:
 Nuland, a village in the Netherlands

Nuland is also a surname and may refer to:
 Sherwin B. Nuland (1930-2014), American surgeon
 Victoria Nuland (born 1961), American diplomat